This is a list of defunct newspapers of Canada.

References 

Defunct
Canada